Honor Girl is a graphic novel memoir written and illustrated by Maggie Thrash. The book was first published in 2015 through Candlewick Press.

Development and publication history
Thrash wrote Honor Girl over the span of two years. While their previous experience was in writing prose rather than graphic novels, a roommate encouraged them to use the latter form for this particular story. Thrash was interested in the possibilities offered by depicting themself visually and began practising drawing so that they could pursue the graphic format.

Candlewick Press published Honor Girl on September 8, 2015.

Synopsis
Honor Girl is the story of writer's Maggie Thrash's first crush at an all-girls summer camp in Kentucky in 2000.

Reception and awards
The New York Times Book Review called the story "sweet and obsessive and dead on," and found that "Thrash shows an impressive grasp of the language of comics."  In its starred review, Kirkus Reviews called the book a "luminescent memoir not to be missed." Honor Girl also received starred reviews from School Library Journal, Publishers Weekly and Kirkus Reviews, and was an official "Junior Library Guild Selection" for Fall 2015. Honor Girl was a finalist for the 2016 Los Angeles Times Book Prize in the Graphic Novel/Comics category.

References

2015 graphic novels
2015 LGBT-related literary works
American memoirs
Autobiographical comics
Autobiographical graphic novels
Comics about women
Feminist comics
Lesbian non-fiction books
LGBT-related graphic novels
LGBT autobiographies
2010s LGBT novels
Lesbian-related comics
Comics set in the United States
LGBT literature in the United States